Lee Frost may refer to:
 Lee Frost (footballer)
 Lee Frost (director)